The Old Charlotte County Courthouse is an historic two-story yellow brick courthouse building located at 227 Taylor Street in Punta Gorda, Florida, Florida. Designed in the Classical Revival style by architects Leitner and Henson of St. Petersburg, it was built between 1927 and 1928 by Paul H. Smith of Haines City. Additions were made to the building the 1960s and 1980s but in 1999 it was replaced by a new Justice Center and then fell into disuse. In 2005, the additions having been demolished, the Board of County Commissioners undertook the restoration and renovation of the original 1928 structure that remained. It was reopened to the public in a ceremony on February 29, 2008.
 

In 1989, the Old Charlotte County Courthouse was listed in A Guide to Florida's Historic Architecture, published by the University of Florida Press.

References

External links
 Florida's Historic Courthouses

Buildings and structures in Charlotte County, Florida
Charlotte